Soundtrack is a 2001 album by jazz trumpeter Guy Barker. The album was nominated for the 2002 Mercury Music Prize.

Track listing
"Underdogs"
"Nature Boy"
"Waiting for the Delay"
"Purr"
"Susannah's Song"
"Izzatso!"
"Queen of the Night"
"Sounds in Black and White"

References

2001 albums
Guy Barker albums